Patrick Dwyer (1946 – 2019) was an English boxer who fought 51 contests between 1965 and 1973. He fought under the name Pat Dwyer.

Biography
Dwyer won the 1965 Amateur Boxing Association British light-middleweight title, when boxing out of the Maple Leaf ABC.

He turned professional in November 1965 and won 20 of his 38 professional victories inside the distance.

References 

1946 births
2019 deaths
Boxers from Liverpool
English male boxers
Light-middleweight boxers